Rho-related GTP-binding protein RhoQ is a protein that in humans is encoded by the RHOQ gene.

TC10 is a member of the RAS superfamily of small GTP-binding proteins (see HRAS, MIM 190020) involved in insulin-stimulated glucose uptake.[supplied by OMIM]

In melanocytic cells RHOQ gene expression may be regulated by MITF.

Interactions
RHOQ has been shown to interact with EXOC7, GOPC, PARD6B, WASL, CDC42EP2, TRIP10 and CDC42EP3.

References

Further reading